Baillie Peak is a peak over  high, located  south-southeast of Mount Angier in the Moore Mountains, Queen Elizabeth Range, Antarctica. The peak was observed by the Ohio State University Geological Party, 1967–68, which named it for Ralph J. Baillie, a field assistant with the party.

References

Mountains of the Ross Dependency
Shackleton Coast